Mengen and Poeng are rather divergent dialects of an Austronesian language of New Britain in Papua New Guinea.

Phonology 

 Both palatalization and labialization  is said to occur in all consonants. Palatalized consonants only occur before back vowels, and labialized consonant sounds may occur before all vowels accept .
  is typically pronounced as uvular , but can also be heard as a velar  in free variation.
 Gemination or length, may also occur among consonant sounds.
 Sounds  are pronounced as voiced stops , but are also heard as fricatives  in intervocalic position.
  may have variation between a trill , a tap , or a voiced stop  within vocabulary.
 Sounds  are said to exist as a result of palatalization or labialization, but only in very few root words in word-initial position.

 Sounds  are raised to  within the environment of consonant length.

References

External links 
 
 

Mengen languages
Languages of East New Britain Province
Languages of West New Britain Province